Eusebio Di Francesco (born 8 September 1969) is an Italian manager, and former professional footballer who played as a midfielder.

Club career
Di Francesco started his career with Tuscan teams Empoli and Lucchese. In 1995, he joined Piacenza, where he had the opportunity to play regularly in the top flight. In 1997, he was signed by A.S. Roma, winning an Italian championship title in 2001 with the giallorossi. Following this triumph, he agreed to return to Piacenza, for 2 billion lire (€1.03 million by fixed exchange rate) and then retired in 2005 following stints with Ancona and Perugia.

International career
During his time with Roma, Di Francesco also made 12 appearances for the Italy national team between 1998 and 2000, and was called up for a total of 16 times. He received his first call-up while with Piacenza, under manager Cesare Maldini, when he was named in Italy's squad for 1997 Tournoi de France, although he later turned down the offer in order to help Piacenza defeat Cagliari 3–1 relegation play-off in order to remain in Serie A. He made his international debut on 5 September 1998, under Dino Zoff, in a 2–0 victory over Wales in a UEFA Euro 2000 qualifying match. In addition to his 12 official appearances with Italy, Di Francesco also made an additional appearance for the Italian national team in an unofficial friendly match against the FIFA World Stars on 16 December 1998, held to celebrate the 100th anniversary of the Italian Football Federation; he scored his only international goal during the match, which ended in a 6–2 victory to the Italians.

Style of play
Di Francesco was a hard-working and consistent midfielder, who, despite not being the most technically gifted footballer, possessed a solid first touch, and an ability to make attacking runs into the area. Capable of playing both in centre or on the wing, he was known in particular for his leadership, versatility, and exceptional stamina, as well as his tireless runs up and down the flank.

Coaching career
After his retirement from football, he served as team manager for A.S. Roma. He then served as sports director (in charge of transfers) for Serie C2 club Val di Sangro in 2007. In 2008, he was appointed as head coach of Lega Pro Prima Divisione club Virtus Lanciano, being later sacked in January 2009 due to poor results.

He then served as head coach of Pescara in the 2010–11 Serie B, guiding his team to an impressive season also thanks to glimpses of attractive football. In June 2011 it was revealed Di Francesco had left Pescara by mutual consent in order to hold talks with Serie A club Lecce regarding the vacant head coaching post at the club from Salento. He was removed from his coaching duties on 4 December 2011, after achieving only eight points in thirteen games, and leaving his side at the bottom of the league table.

On 19 June 2012, Di Francesco was appointed the head coach of Serie B side Sassuolo. At the end of 2012–13 season, he guided Sassuolo to the Serie B championship and promotion to the top-flight campaign. He was sacked on 28 January 2014 after a poor run of results, only to be re-appointed to the post on 3 March 2014 after results did not improve in his absence. From March 2014 onwards, results improved and Di Francesco successfully coached to save Sassuolo from relegation thanks to a run of positive results (13 points in the final seven games of the season). In June 2014, it was announced Di Francesco had signed an extension that will keep him contracted with Sassuolo until June 2016. He extended his contract again in April 2016, which would last until June 2019. Sassuolo finished the 2015–16 Serie A season in sixth place, sealing a spot in the third qualifying round of the 2016–17 UEFA Europa League. The following season, Sassuolo managed to advance to the Europa League play-offs under Di Francesco, and eventually sealed a spot in the Europa League group stage.

On 13 June 2017, Di Francesco was appointed as Roma head coach, replacing Luciano Spalletti, who left for Inter. In his first season with the Serie A club, he finished third, qualifying for the 2018–19 UEFA Champions League. In the 2017–18 UEFA Champions League, Roma qualified for the knockout round after topping a group including Chelsea and Atlético Madrid. In the quarter finals, Roma were able to overturn a 4–1 first leg deficit to defeat Barcelona to progress to the next round. They were eventually defeated by Liverpool in the semi finals (7–6 on aggregate).

On 30 January 2019, Roma were knocked out of 2018–19 Coppa Italia after being beaten 7–1 by Fiorentina. On 7 March 2019, Di Francesco was sacked by Roma following a Champions League exit in the round of 16 against Porto. At the time of his sacking, Roma were 5th in Serie A. Jim Pallotta, club's president to Roma's official website:

On 22 June 2019, he was appointed new head coach of Serie A club Sampdoria. On 7 October 2019, with Sampdoria in last place in Serie A table and with 6 losses in 7 league games, he left the club by mutual consent.

Di Francesco was appointed manager of yet another Serie A club, Cagliari, on 3 August 2020. Di Francesco was sacked on 22 February 2021.

On 7 June 2021, he was unveiled as the new Hellas Verona head coach, signing a two-year contract, until 30 June 2023, starting with the 2021–22 Serie A season. but following three defeats in the first three league games he was sacked on 14 September 2021.

Personal life
Eusebio Di Francesco has a son, Federico (born in 1994), who followed his father's footsteps by becoming a footballer too. He plays as a winger and made his Serie A debut in March 2013 at the age of 18. Eusebio Di Francesco was named after the Portuguese Football legend Eusébio.

Managerial statistics

Honours

Player
Roma
Serie A: 2000–01

Manager
Sassuolo
Serie B: 2012–13

Individual
Panchina d'argento: 2012–13
Football Leader: 2013 (The First Serie B)
Enzo Bearzot Award: 2018

References

1969 births
Living people
Italian footballers
Italy international footballers
Italian football managers
Empoli F.C. players
S.S.D. Lucchese 1905 players
Piacenza Calcio 1919 players
A.S. Roma players
A.C. Ancona players
A.C. Perugia Calcio players
S.S. Virtus Lanciano 1924 managers
Delfino Pescara 1936 managers
U.S. Lecce managers
Serie A players
Serie B players
Association football midfielders
Serie A managers
U.S. Sassuolo Calcio managers
A.S. Roma managers
U.C. Sampdoria managers
Cagliari Calcio managers